Johanna Frändén, (born 31 August 1981), is a Swedish sport journalist particularly specializing in association football (soccer) who files reports from the European football leagues for the sport section of the Aftonbladet newspaper and for Sveriges Television (SVT). She had the special task of following Zlatan Ibrahimović's career for the media.

Career

Early life
Frändén was born on 31 August 1981 in Lerdala near Skövde. She studied Spanish during her high school years. During 2005, she got in contact with Aftonbladet sports editor Simon Bank, which led to her moving to Stockholm in 2006 to do some work for the newspaper's sports section.

Work
Frändén is often invited as an expert commentator during the World Cup, as she did in 2010 World Cup in South Africa and the 2014 World Cup in Brazil, and during European Football Championships, most notably Euro 2012 and Euro 2016. She has been involved in SVT coverage of two World Cups and two Euro championships so far.

During the summer of 2006, Frändén was dispatched to France by Aftonbladet to cover the aftermath of the Euro 2006 football championship. She also had the special task of following Zlatan Ibrahimovićs career for SVT. She relocated to Barcelona when Ibrahimović started playing for FC Barcelona, and moved to Paris when he started playing in the French Ligue 1.

In 2011, Frändén participated in the SVT game show På spåret in a team with Carl Johan De Geer. The following year she won the SvenskaFans.com s "Guldskölden" (en:the golden shield) award as Sweden's best Twitter poster for sports. In May 2013, she won the "Frilanspriset" (en:the freelance award) of the Poppius journalist school.

References

External links

1981 births
Living people
Swedish sports journalists
Swedish sports broadcasters